The 1992 Waldbaum's Hamlet Cup was a tennis tournament played on outdoor hard courts. It was the 12th edition of the event known that year as the Waldbaum's Hamlet Cup, and was part of the World Series of the 1992 ATP Tour. It took place at the Hamlet Golf and Country Club in Commack, Long Island, New York, United States, from August 24 through August 30, 1992.

The singles featured ATP No. 2, reigning US Open champion, Australian Open runner-up, Hamburg and New Haven winner Stefan Edberg, San Francisco, Indian Wells, Miami titlist Michael Chang, and Toronto, Cincinnati runner-up, Long Island defending champion Ivan Lendl. Other seeds were French Open finalist, Philadelphia winner Petr Korda, Brussels, Rotterdam champion Boris Becker, Sergi Bruguera, Alexander Volkov and Brad Gilbert.

Finals

Singles

 Petr Korda defeated  Ivan Lendl, 6–2, 6–2
 It was Korda's 2nd singles title of the year and the 4th of his career.

Doubles

 Francisco Montana /  Greg Van Emburgh defeated  Gianluca Pozzi /  Olli Rahnasto, 6–4, 6–2

References

External links
 ITF tournament edition details

 
Waldbaum's Hamlet Cup
1992
Waldbaum's Hamlet Cup